Libeisaygahun is a chiefdom of Bombali District in the Northern Province of Sierra Leone. The principal town lies at Batkanu.

As of 2004 the chiefdom has a population of 13,355.

References

Chiefdoms of Sierra Leone
Northern Province, Sierra Leone